The 2011 Rolex 24 at Daytona ran on Saturday and Sunday January 29–30, 2011 at the Daytona International Speedway was the 49th running of the 24 Hours of Daytona endurance race. The first race of the 2011 Rolex Sports Car Series season, it was broadcast on Speed Channel, with fourteen hours of live coverage, in addition to a considerable attendance.

Qualifying
Pole position for the race was won by Jörg Bergmeister of Germany, driving the #45 Daytona Prototype of Flying Lizard Motorsports, a Riley Technologies chassis powered by a Porsche engine, with a lap time of 1 minute 40.099 seconds. Pole for the Grand Touring category was won by Dominik Farnbacher in the #66 The Racer's Group Porsche 911, with a lap time of 1 minute 48.781 seconds.

Results
Winning the race overall was the Daytona Prototype team of Chip Ganassi Racing, with drivers Scott Pruett, Memo Rojas, Graham Rahal, and Joey Hand driving the #01 Riley & Scott-BMW defeating Chip Ganassi Racing's second team, consisting of IndyCar drivers Scott Dixon and Dario Franchitti, and Sprint Cup teammates Jamie McMurray and Juan Pablo Montoya in the #02 Riley & Scott-BMW by just over two seconds in a one-lap sprint following a late caution flag. The win was Pruett's fourth overall victory in the 24 Hours of Daytona, and the fourth of four major auto racing wins by Ganassi in the last year, following victories in the 2010 Daytona 500, 2010 Indianapolis 500 and 2010 Brickyard 400; co-driver Rahal's victory came 30 years after his father, Bobby Rahal, won the race in 1981.

The GT division victory was claimed by The Racer's Group, the #67 Porsche 911 GT3 Cup driven by Andy Lally, Spencer Pumpelly, Brendan Gaughan, Wolf Henzler, and Steven Bertheau winning by a margin of one lap.

Patrick Dempsey, a television actor, placed third in the GT category in the #40 Mazda RX-8.

Although there were no serious accidents during the race, dense fog in the early morning hours resulted in a caution period lasting nearly three hours.

Race results

Class winners in bold.

References

24 Hours of Daytona
Daytona
24 Hours of Daytona